The 2013–14 Texas–Pan American Broncs women's basketball team represented the University of Texas–Pan American during the 2013–14 NCAA Division I women's basketball season. It was head coach Larry Tidwell's first season at UTPA. The Broncs played their home games at the UTPA Fieldhouse and were new members of the Western Athletic Conference. The Broncs would finish the season as the 4-seed in the WAC Tournament and finish the year 14–16 overall.

Roster

Schedule and results
Source

|-
!colspan=9 style="background:#006600; color:#FF6600;"| Regular Season

|-
!colspan=9 style="background:#FF6600; color:#006600;"| 2014 WAC tournament

See also
2013–14 Texas–Pan American Broncs men's basketball team

References

UT Rio Grande Valley Vaqueros women's basketball seasons
Texas-Pan American
Texas-Pan American Broncs women's basketball
Texas-Pan American Broncs women's basketball